The Korean People's Army (KPA) is the military force of North Korea and the armed wing of the Workers' Party of Korea (WPK). Under the Songun policy, it is the central institution of North Korean society. Currently, WPK General Secretary Kim Jong-un serves as Supreme Commander and the chairman of the WPK Central Military Commission. The KPA consists of five branches: the Ground Force, the Naval Force, the Air and Anti-Air Force, the Strategic Rocket Forces, and the Special Operation Force.

History

Korean People's Revolutionary Army 1932–1948
This revolutionary army was transformed into the regular army on 8 February 1948. Both these are celebrated as army days, with decennial anniversaries treated as major celebrations, except from 1978 to 2014 when only the 1932 anniversary was celebrated.

Korean Volunteer Army 1939–1948
In 1939, the Korean Volunteer Army (KVA), was formed in Yan'an, China. The two individuals responsible for the army were Kim Tu-bong and Mu Chong. At the same time, a school was established near Yan'an for training military and political leaders for a future independent Korea. By 1945, the KVA had grown to approximately 1,000 men, mostly Korean deserters from the Imperial Japanese Army. During this period, the KVA fought alongside the Chinese communist Northeast Anti-Japanese United Army from which it drew its arms and ammunition. After the defeat of the Japanese, the KVA accompanied the Chinese Communist Party forces into eastern Jilin, intending to gain recruits from ethnic Koreans in China, particularly from Yanbian, and then enter Korea.

Soviet Korean Units
Just after World War II and during the Soviet Union's occupation of the part of Korea north of the 38th Parallel, the Soviet 25th Army headquarters in Pyongyang issued a statement ordering all armed resistance groups in the northern part of the peninsula to disband on 12 October 1945. Two thousand Koreans with previous experience in the Soviet Red Army were sent to various locations around the country to organise constabulary forces with permission from Soviet military headquarters, and the force was created on 21 October 1945.

Formation of National Army
The headquarters felt a need for a separate unit for security around railways, and the formation of the unit was announced on 11 January 1946. That unit was activated on 15 August of the same year to supervise existing security forces and creation of the national armed forces.

Military institutes such as the Pyongyang Academy (became No. 2 KPA Officers School in Jan. 1949) and the Central Constabulary Academy (became KPA Military Academy in Dec. 1948) soon followed for the education of political and military officers for the new armed forces.

After the military was organised and facilities to educate its new recruits were constructed, the Constabulary Discipline Corps was reorganised into the Korean People's Army General Headquarters. The previously semi-official units became military regulars with the distribution of Soviet uniforms, badges, and weapons that followed the inception of the headquarters.

The State Security Department, a forerunner to the Ministry of People's Defense, was created as part of the Interim People's Committee on 4 February 1948. The formal creation of the Korean People's Army was announced four days later on 8 February, the day after the Fourth Plenary Session of the People's Assembly approved the plan to separate the roles of the military and those of the police, seven months before the government of the Democratic People's Republic of Korea was proclaimed on 9 September 1948. In addition, the Ministry of Defense was established, which controlled a central guard battalion, two divisions, and an independent mixed and combined arms brigade.

Conflicts and events

Before the outbreak of the Korean War, Soviet leader Joseph Stalin equipped the KPA with modern tanks, trucks, artillery, and small arms (at the time, the South Korean Army had nothing remotely comparable either in numbers of troops or equipment). During the opening phases of the Korean War in 1950, the KPA quickly drove South Korean forces south and captured Seoul, only to lose 70,000 of their 100,000-strong army in the autumn after U.S. amphibious landings at the Battle of Incheon and a subsequent drive to the Yalu River. On 4 November, China openly staged a military intervention. On 7 December, Kim Il-sung was deprived of the right of command of KPA by China. The KPA subsequently played a secondary minor role to the Chinese People's Volunteer Army in the remainder of the conflict. By the time of the Armistice in 1953, the KPA had sustained 290,000 casualties and lost 90,000 men as POWs.
	
In 1953, the Military Armistice Commission (MAC) was able to oversee and enforce the terms of the armistice. The Neutral Nations Supervisory Commission (NNSC), made up of delegations from Czechoslovakia, Poland, Sweden and Switzerland, carried out inspections to ensure implementation of the terms of the Armistice that prevented reinforcements or new weapons being brought into Korea.
	
Soviet thinking on the strategic scale was replaced since December 1962 with a people's war concept. The Soviet idea of direct warfare was replaced with a Maoist war of attrition strategy. Along with the mechanisation of some infantry units, more emphasis was put on light weapons, high-angle indirect fire, night fighting, and sea denial.

Date of establishment history
Until 1977, the official date of establishment of the Korean People's Army was 8 February 1948. In 1978, the date was changed to 25 April 1932, the date the Korean People's Revolutionary Army, Kim Il-sung's anti-Japanese guerrilla force, was formed. However, this change did not last, and by 2019, the KPA's date of establishment had been reverted to 8 February 1948.

Organization

Commission and leadership
The primary path for command and control of the KPA extends through the National Defence Commission which was led by its chairman Kim Jong-il until 2011, to the Ministry of Defence and its General Staff Department. From there on, command and control flows to the various bureaus and operational units. A secondary path, to ensure political control of the military establishment, extends through the Workers' Party of Korea's Central Military Commission.

Since 1990, numerous and dramatic transformations within North Korea have led to the current command and control structure. The details of the majority of these changes are simply unknown to the world. What little is known indicates that many changes were the natural result of the deaths of the aging leadership including Kim Il-sung (July 1994), Minister of People's Armed Forces O Chin-u (February 1995) and Minister of Defence Choi Kwang (February 1997).

The vast majority of changes were undertaken to secure the power and position of Kim Jong-il. At the Eighteenth session of the sixth Central People's Committee, held on 23 May 1990, the SAC became established as its own independent commission, rising to the same status as the CPC (now the Cabinet of North Korea) and not subordinated to it, as was the case before. Concurrent with this, Kim Jong-il was appointed first vice-chairman of the National Defence Commission. The following year, on 24 December 1991, Kim Jong-il was appointed Supreme Commander of the Korean People's Army. Four months later, on 20 April 1992, Kim Jong-il was awarded the rank of Marshal and his father, in virtue of being the KPA's founding commander in chief, became Grand Marshal as a result and one year later he became the Chairman of the National Defence Commission, by now under Supreme People's Assembly control under the then 1992 constitution as amended.

Almost all officers of the KPA began their military careers as privates; only very few people are admitted to a military academy without prior service. The results is an egalitarian military system where officers are familiar with the life of a military private and "military nobility" is all but nonexistent.

Within the KPA, between December 1991 and December 1995, nearly 800 high officers (out of approximately 1,200) received promotions and preferential assignments. Three days after Kim Jong-il became Marshal, eight generals were appointed to the rank of Vice-Marshal. In April 1997, on the 85th anniversary of Kim Il-sung's birthday, Kim Jong-il promoted 127 general and admiral grade officers. The following April he ordered the promotions of another 22 generals and flag officers. Along with these changes, many KPA officers were appointed to influential positions within the Korean Workers' Party. These promotions continue today, simultaneous with the celebration of Kim Il-sung's birthday and the KPA anniversary celebrations every April and since recently in July to honour the end of the Korean War. Under Kim Jong-il's leadership, political officers dispatched from the party monitored every move of a general's daily life, according to analysts similar to the work of Soviet political commissars during the early and middle years of the military establishment.

Today the KPA exercises full control of both the Politburo and the Central Military Commission of the WPK, the KPA General Political and General Staff Departments and the Ministry of Defence, all having KPA representatives with a minimum general officer rank. Following changes made during the 4th session of the 13th Supreme People's Assembly on 29 June 2016, the State Affairs Commission has overseen the Ministry of Defence as part of its systemic responsibilities. All members of the State Affairs Commission have membership status (regular or alternate) on the WPK Political Bureau.

Ground force formations
I Corps (Hoeyang County, Kangwon Province)
II Corps (Pyongsan County, North Hwanghae Province)
III Corps (Nampo, South Pyongan)
IV Corps (Haeju, South Hwanghae Province)
V Corps (Sepo County, Kangwon Province)
VII Corps (Hamhung, South Hamgyong Province)
Pyongyang Defense Command
XII Corps
IX Corps (Chongjin, North Hamgyong Province)
X Corps (Hyesan, Ryanggang Province)
XI Corps (Tokchon, South Pyongan Province)
Mechanised infantry divisions:
108th Division
425th Division
806th Division
815th Division
820th Tank Corps

Conscription and terms of service

North Korea has conscription for males for 10 years. Females are conscripted up until the age of 23. Article 86 of the North Korean Constitution states: "National defence is the supreme duty and honour of citizens.
Citizens shall defend the country and serve in the armed forces as
required by law."

KPA soldiers serve three years of military service in the KPA, which also runs its own factories, farms and trading arms.

Paramilitary organisations
The Red Youth Guards are the youth cadet corps of the KPA for secondary level and university level students. Every Saturday, they hold mandatory 4-hour military training drills, and have training activities on and off campus to prepare them for military service when they turn 18 or after graduation, as well as for contingency measures in peacetime.

Under the Ministry of Social Security and the wartime control of the Ministry of Defence, and formerly the Korean People's Security Forces, the Korean People's Social Security Forces (KPSSF) forms the national gendarmerie and civil defence force of the KPA. The KPSSF has its units in various fields like civil defence, traffic management, civil disturbance control, and local security. It has its own special forces units. The service shares the ranks of the KPA (with the exception of Marshals) but wears different uniforms.

Budget and commercial interests

The KPA's annual budget is approximately US$6 billion. In 2009, the U.S. Institute for Science and International Security reported that North Korea may possess fissile material for around two to nine nuclear warheads. The North Korean Songun ("Military First") policy elevates the KPA to the primary position in the government and society.

According to North Korea's state news agency, military expenditures for 2010 made up 15.8 percent of the state budget. Most analyses of North Korea's defence sector, however, estimate that defence spending constitutes between one-quarter and one-third of all government spending. , according to the International Institute of Strategic Studies, North Korea's defence budget consumed some 25 percent of central government spending. In the mid-1970s and early 1980s, according to figures released by the Polish Arms Control and Disarmament Agency, between 32 and 38 percent of central government expenditures went towards defence.

North Korea sells missiles and military equipment to many countries worldwide. In April 2009, the United Nations named the Korea Mining and Development Trading Corporation (KOMID) as North Korea's primary arms dealer and main exporter of equipment related to ballistic missiles and conventional weapons. It also named Korea Ryonbong as a supporter of North Korea's military related sales.

Historically, North Korea has assisted a vast number of revolutionary, insurgent and terrorist groups in more than 62 countries. A cumulative total of more than 5,000 foreign personnel have been trained in North Korea, and over 7,000 military advisers, primarily from the Reconnaissance General Bureau, have been dispatched to some forty-seven countries. Some of the organisations which received North Korean aid include the Polisario Front, Janatha Vimukthi Peramuna, the Communist Party of Thailand, the Palestine Liberation Organization and the Islamic Revolutionary Guard Corps. The Zimbabwean Fifth Brigade received its initial training from KPA instructors. North Korean troops allegedly saw combat during the Libyan–Egyptian War and the Angolan Civil War. Up to 200 KPAF pilots took part in the Vietnam War, scoring several kills against U.S. aircraft. Two KPA anti-aircraft artillery regiments were sent to North Vietnam as well.

North Korean instructors trained Hezbollah fighters in guerrilla warfare tactics around 2004, prior to the Second Lebanon War. During the Syrian Civil War, Arabic-speaking KPA officers may have assisted the Syrian Arab Army in military operations planning and have supervised artillery bombardments in the Battle of Aleppo.

Service branches

Ground Force

The Korean People's Army Ground Force (KPAGF) is the main branch of the Korean People's Army responsible for land-based military operations. It is the de facto army of North Korea.

Naval Force

The Korean People's Army Naval Force (KPANF) is organized into two fleets (West Fleet and East Fleet, the latter being the larger of the two) which, owing to the limited range and general disrepair of their vessels, are not able to support each other, let alone meet for joint operations. The East Fleet is headquartered at T'oejo-dong and the West Fleet at Nampho. A number of training, shipbuilding and maintenance units and a naval air wing report directly to Naval Command Headquarters at Pyongyang.

Air and Anti-Air Force

The Korean People's Army Air and Anti-Air Force (KPAAF) is also responsible for North Korea's air defence forces through the use of anti-aircraft artillery and surface-to-air missiles (SAM). While much of the equipment is outdated, the high saturation of multilayered, overlapping, mutually supporting air defence sites provides a formidable challenge to enemy air attacks.

Strategic Rocket Force

The Korean People's Army Strategic Rocket Force (KPASRF) is a major division of the KPA that controls North Korea's nuclear and conventional strategic missiles. It is mainly equipped with surface-to-surface missiles of Soviet and Chinese design, as well as locally developed long-range missiles.

Special Operation Force

The Korean People's Army Special Operation Force (KPASOF) is an asymmetric force with a total troop size of 200,000. Since the Korean War, it has continued to play a role of concentrating infiltration of troops into the territory of South Korea and conducting sabotage.

Capabilities

After the Korean War, North Korea maintained a powerful, but smaller military force than that of South Korea. In 1967 the KPA forces of about 345,000 were much smaller than the South Korean ground forces of about 585,000. North Korea's relative isolation and economic plight starting from the 1980s has now tipped the balance of military power into the hands of the better-equipped South Korean military. In response to this predicament, North Korea relies on asymmetric warfare techniques and unconventional weaponry to achieve parity against high-tech enemy forces. North Korea is reported to have developed a wide range of technologies towards this end, such as stealth paint to conceal ground targets, midget submarines and human torpedoes, blinding laser weapons, and probably has a chemical weapons program and is likely to possess a stockpile of chemical weapons. The Korean People's Army operates ZM-87 anti-personnel lasers, which are banned under the United Nations Protocol on Blinding Laser Weapons.

Since the 1980s, North Korea has also been actively developing its own cyber warfare capabilities. , the secretive Bureau 121 – the elite North Korean cyber warfare unit – comprises approximately 1,800 highly trained hackers. In December 2014, the Bureau was accused of hacking Sony Pictures and making threats, leading to the cancellation of The Interview, a political satire comedy film based on the assassination of Kim Jong-un. The Korean People's Army has also made advances in electronic warfare by developing GPS jammers. Current models include vehicle-mounted jammers with a range of –. Jammers with a range of more than 100 km are being developed, along with electromagnetic pulse bombs. The Korean People's Army has also made attempts to jam South Korean military satellites. North Korea does not have satellites capable of obtaining satellite imagery useful for military purposes, and appears to use imagery from foreign commercial platforms.

Despite the general fuel and ammunition shortages for training, it is estimated that the wartime strategic reserves of food for the army are sufficient to feed the regular troops for 500 days, while fuel and ammunition – amounting to 1.5 million and 1.7 million tonnes respectively – are sufficient to wage a full-scale war for 100 days.

The KPA does not operate aircraft carriers, but has other means of power projection. Korean People's Air Force Il-76MD aircraft provide a strategic airlift capacity of 6,000 troops, while the Navy's sea lift capacity amounts to 15,000 troops. The Strategic Rocket Forces operate more than 1,000 ballistic missiles according to South Korean officials in 2010, although the U.S. Department of Defense reported in 2012 that North Korea has fewer than 200 missile launchers. North Korea acquired 12 Foxtrot class and Golf-II class missile submarines as scrap in 1993. Some analysts suggest that these have either been refurbished with the help of Russian experts or their launch tubes have been reverse-engineered and externally fitted to regular submarines or cargo ships. However the U.S. Department of Defense does not list them as active.

A photograph of Kim Jong-un receiving a briefing from his top generals on 29 March 2013 showed a list that purported to show that the military had a minimum of 40 submarines, 13 landing ships, 6 minesweepers, 27 support vessels and 1,852 aircraft.

The Korean People's Army operates a very large amount of equipment, including 4,100 tanks, 2,100 APCs, 8,500 field artillery pieces, 5,100 multiple rocket launchers, 11,000 air defence guns and some 10,000 MANPADS and anti-tank guided missiles in the Ground force; about 500 vessels in the Navy and 730 combat aircraft in the Air Force, of which 478 are fighters and 180 are bombers. North Korea also has the largest special forces in the world, as well as the largest submarine fleet. The equipment is a mixture of World War II vintage vehicles and small arms, widely proliferated Cold War technology, and more modern Soviet or locally produced weapons.

North Korea possesses a vast array of long range artillery in shelters just north of the Korean Demilitarized Zone. It has been a long-standing cause for concern that a preemptive strike or retaliatory strike on Seoul using this arsenal of artillery north of the Demilitarized Zone would lead to a massive loss of life in Seoul. Estimates on how many people would die in an attack on Seoul vary. When the Clinton administration mobilised forces over the reactor at Yongbyon in 1994, planners concluded that retaliation by North Korea against Seoul could kill 40,000 people. Other estimates projects hundreds of thousands or possibly millions of fatalities if North Korea uses chemical or nuclear munitions. RAND Corporation conducted an extensive study in 2020 on a range of potential artillery bombardment scenarios and concluded that a strike on Seoul alone could result in over 100,000 casualties in the first hour of bombardment.

Military equipment

Weapons
The KPA possess a variety of Chinese and Soviet sourced equipment and weaponry, as well as locally produced versions and improvements of the former. Soldiers are mostly armed with indigenous Kalashnikov-type rifles as the standard issue weapon. Front line troops are issued the Type 88, while the older Type 58 assault rifle and Type 68A/B have been shifted to rear echelon or home guard units.
A rifle of unknown nomenclature was seen during the 2017 Day of the Sun military parade, appearing to consist of a grenade launcher and a standard assault rifle, similar to the U.S. OICW or South Korean S&T Daewoo K11.
North Korea generally designates rifles as "Type XX", similar to the Chinese naming system. On 15 November 2018, North Korea successfully tested a "newly developed ultramodern tactical weapon". Leader Kim Jong-un observed the test at the Academy of Defense Science and called it a "decisive turn" in bolstering the combat power of the North Korean army.

There is a Korean People's Army Military Hardware Museum located in Pyongyang that displays a range of the equipment used.

Chemical weapons

The U.S. Department of Defense believes North Korea probably has a chemical weapons program and is likely to possess a stockpile of such weapons.

Nuclear capabilities

North Korea has tested a series of different missiles, including short-, medium-, intermediate-, and intercontinental- range, and submarine-launched ballistic missiles. Estimates of the country's nuclear stockpile vary: some experts believe Pyongyang has between fifteen and twenty nuclear weapons, while U.S. intelligence believes the number to be between thirty and sixty. The regime conducted two tests of an intercontinental ballistic missile (ICBM) capable of carrying a large nuclear warhead in July 2017.

Nuclear tests

On 9 October 2006, the North Korean government announced that it had unsuccessfully attempted a nuclear test for the first time. Experts at the United States Geological Survey and Japanese seismological authorities detected an earthquake with a preliminary estimated magnitude of 4.3 from the site in North Korea, proving the official claims to be true.

North Korea also went on to claim that it had developed a nuclear weapon in 2009. It is widely believed to possess a stockpile of relatively simple nuclear weapons. The IAEA has met , the Director General of the General Department of Atomic Energy (GDAE) of North Korea, to discuss nuclear matters. Ri Je-son was also mentioned in this role in 2002 in a United Nations article.

On 3 September 2017, the North Korean leadership announced that it had conducted a nuclear test with what it claimed to be its first hydrogen bomb detonation. The detonation took place at an underground location at the Punggye-ri nuclear test site in North Hamgyong Province at 12:00 pm local time. South Korean officials claimed the test yielded 50 kilotons of explosive force, with many international observers claiming the test likely involved some form of a thermonuclear reaction.

 2006 North Korean nuclear test
 2009 North Korean nuclear test
 2013 North Korean nuclear test
 January 2016 North Korean nuclear test
 September 2016 North Korean nuclear test
 September 2017 North Korean nuclear test

Other
 Tonghae Satellite Launching Ground
 Ryanggang explosion
 Yongbyon Nuclear Scientific Research Center
 Songun
 Asymmetric warfare
 The launching of Kwangmyŏngsŏng-3 and Kwangmyŏngsŏng-3 Unit 2 in 2012.

Uniforms

KPA officers and soldiers are most often seen wearing a mix of olive green or tan uniforms. The basic dress uniform consists of a tunic and pants (white tunics for general officers in special occasions); female soldiers wear knee length skirts but can sometimes wear pants.

Caps or peaked caps, especially for officers (and sometimes berets for women) are worn in spring and summer months and a Russian style fur hat (the Ushanka hats) in winter. A variant of the Disruptive Pattern Material, the Disruptive Pattern Combat Uniform (green), the ERDL pattern, the M81 Woodland and the Tigerstripe is also being worn by a few and rare images of North Korean army officers and service personnel. In Non-Dress uniforms, a steel helmet (the North Korean produced Type 40 helmet, a copy of the Soviet SSH40) seems to be the most common headgear, and is sometimes worn with a camouflage covering.

Standard military boots are worn for combat, women wear low heel shoes or heel boots for formal parades.

Camouflage uniforms are slowly becoming more common in the KPA. During the April 15, 2012 parade, Kevlar helmets were displayed in certain KPA units and similar helmets are currently used by KPA special operations forces.

During the parade on 10 October 2020, a range of at least five new pixelated camouflage patterns and new soldiers' combat gear such as body armor, bulletproof helmets of all branches were shown for the first time. Even though it was difficult to tell the patterns apart from each other, two different green based designs, an arid camouflage design, blue camouflage design, and a two-color pixelated camouflage pattern for mountain and winter warfare were all observed. Also, the use of Multicam pattern uniforms by North Korean military personnel was first documented in 2020 during the same parade, although uniforms in this design may well have appeared in the armed forces inventory much earlier.

See also

April 25 Sports Club
Central Military Band of the Korean People's Army
Joson Inmingun
Korean conflict
Military Foundation Day
Republic of Korea Armed Forces
Songun
Worker-Peasant Red Guards

Notes

References

Further reading

External links

 North Korea Military-Political Background
KPA Equipment Holdings
CIA World Factbook
KPA Journal

 
Military units and formations established in the 1940s
Workers' Party of Korea
History of the Workers' Party of Korea
Military wings of communist parties

bn:উত্তর কোরিয়ার সামরিক বাহিনী